Son Seung-Joon  (born May 16, 1982) is a South Korean football player who currently plays for Henan Jianye F.C. (formerly Suwon Samsung Bluewings, Gwangju Sangmu and Jeonbuk Hyundai Motors).

Summary 
Son is a talented defender who can play as defensive midfielder, central defender and even wingback. His nickname in his youth was 'Mr. Fighter' due to his physical fighting and strength. He was one of the members called 'The children of Kim Ho', the head coach of U-23 Korea national team of Athene Olympic Team.

Football Player Experience

Career 
In year 2001, he entered Suwon Samsung Bluewings as the priority selection from university players, and in year 2004, he got started his military service in Gwangju Sangmu, which is the special team for talented football players. In 2007, he came back to Suwon Samsung Bluewings but there was no room because head coach changed and foreign defenders such as Mato Neretljak already got his position. Following this situation, he transferred to Jeonbuk Hyundai because current Korea National Team head coach Choi Kang-Hee really wanted him. He was the member of K-League Champion in 2009 and 2011 and runner-up of AFC Champions League in 2011. In 2012, he moved to Henan Jianye F.C. in China Super League and played 43 games as defensive midfielder and central defender.

Career Statistics 
{|class="wikitable" style="text-align:center"
|-
!Club !! Year !! Apps !! Goal !! Assist
|-
| Suwon Samsung || 2001~2004 ||45 || 0||2
|-
| Gwangju Sangmu || 2005~2006 ||19 || 1||6
|-
| Suwon Samsung || 2007~2008 ||5 || 0||0 |
|-
| Jeonbuk Hyundai || 2009~2011 ||40 || 3||0
|-
| Henan Jianye F.C. || 2012~2014 ||64 || 4||0
|-
! Total (K-League)|| - ||109|| 4||8
|-
! Total (China Super League)|| - ||64|| 4||0
|}
K-League records include K-League Cup records. as of the end of yr 2010.

Play Style 
The assessment by the coaches were outstanding among the players of Jeonbuk Hyundai in the view of football sense and fighting spirit. Based on his good physical, he could get an air ball easily and well participate in the offense with his basic skills.

References

External links 
 

1982 births
Living people
South Korean footballers
South Korean expatriate footballers
Suwon Samsung Bluewings players
Gimcheon Sangmu FC players
Jeonbuk Hyundai Motors players
Henan Songshan Longmen F.C. players
Chinese Super League players
K League 1 players
South Korean expatriate sportspeople in China
Expatriate footballers in China
Association football defenders